Shaukat Manzoor Cheema (15 January 1954 – 3 June 2020) was a Pakistani politician who was a Member of the Provincial Assembly of the Punjab from 2008 to May 2020.

Early life and education
Cheema was born on 15 January 1954 in Wazirabad.

He graduated in 2005 from the University of the Punjab and held a Bachelor of Arts degree.

Political career
Cheema was elected to the Provincial Assembly of the Punjab as a candidate of the Pakistan Muslim League (N) (PML-N) from Constituency PP-104 (Gujranwala-XIV) in the 2008 Pakistani general election. He received 41,217 votes and defeated a candidate of Pakistan Peoples Party.

He was re-elected to the Provincial Assembly of the Punjab as a candidate of PML-N from Constituency PP-104 (Gujranwala-XIV) in the 2013 Pakistani general election.

He was re-elected to the Provincial Assembly of the Punjab as a candidate of PML-N from Constituency PP-51 (Gujranwala-I) in the 2018 Pakistani general election.

Death
Cheema died on 3 June 2020, after contracting COVID-19 during the COVID-19 pandemic in Pakistan. He had been under treatment at a hospital in Lahore, and was reportedly on ventilator support.

References

Punjab MPAs 2013–2018
Punjab MPAs 2008–2013
1954 births
2020 deaths
Pakistan Muslim League (N) MPAs (Punjab)
Punjab MPAs 2018–2023
People from Wazirabad
University of the Punjab alumni
Deaths from the COVID-19 pandemic in Punjab, Pakistan